Jennifer Álvarez (born 19 November 1993 in Cienfuegos) is a Cuban volleyball player. She is a member of the Cuba women's national volleyball team and played for Cienfuegos in 2014. 

She was part of the Cuban national team at the  2010 FIVB Volleyball Women's World Championship in Japan. and the 2014 FIVB Volleyball Women's World Championship in Italy.

Career
Álvarez signed with the Romanian club CS Volei Alba-Blaj for the 2017/18 season.

Clubs
  Cienfuegos (2014)
  CS Volei Alba-Blaj (2017-2018)

References

1993 births
Living people
Cuban women's volleyball players
People from Cienfuegos
Volleyball players at the 2015 Pan American Games
Pan American Games competitors for Cuba
Wing spikers
Cuban expatriates in Romania
Expatriate volleyball players in Romania
21st-century Cuban women